César Guillermo Castillo Reyes ( : born 17 March 1966) is a Guatemalan politician and lawyer who is the incumbent Vice President of Guatemala. Castillo graduated as a lawyer from the Universidad de San Carlos de Guatemala in 1998 and then completed a master's degree in human rights at the Rafael Landívar University.

Castillo was Deputy Minister of Labor from January 2004 to May 2005. He also served as a member of the board of directors of the Bar Association and Notaries of Guatemala. In 2013 he was appointed executive director of the Chamber of Commerce of Guatemala, leaving office in 2018.

In the National Assembly of Vamos, he was elected candidate for Vice President and running mate of Alejandro Giammattei.

References

 

Living people
1966 births
Guatemalan politicians
20th-century Guatemalan lawyers
People from Huehuetenango Department
Universidad de San Carlos de Guatemala alumni
Vamos (Guatemala) politicians
Vice presidents of Guatemala